Özgür Özel (born 21 September 1974) is a Turkish politician from the Republican People's Party (CHP) who has served as a parliamentary group leader of the CHP since June 2015, along with Engin Altay and Levent Gök. He is a former pharmacist and has been a Member of Parliament for the electoral district of Manisa since the 2011 general election. He is well known for his activism concerning the rights of miners in Manisa Province.

Early life and career

Education
Özgür Özel was born on 21 September 1974 in Manisa and completed his primary education there. He completed his secondary education and started college at İzmir Bornova Anadolu High School, but returned to Manisa where he graduated from college. He graduated from Ege University Faculty of Pharmaceuticals.

Pharmacist
After graduating from university, Özel worked as a retail pharmacist until being elected as an MP in 2011. Starting in 2007, he has served as an executive board member, accountant and two-term General Secretary for the Turkish Pharmacists Association, having also made numerous statements and presentations in 163 different congresses and conferences. He is also a member of the International Pharmacists Federation, the European Union Pharmacists Group and the European Pharmacists Forum.

Political career

Republican People's Party
Özel was elected as a Member of Parliament for the electoral district of Manisa in the 2011 general election and was re-elected in June 2015 and November 2015. He was elected to the CHP party council in the party's 18th Extraordinary Convention held in September 2014. As an MP, he is a member of the parliamentary Health Commission and the Prisons Investigatory Commission. At the start of the short-lived 25th Parliament on 24 June 2015, he was elected as a CHP parliamentary group leader and was re-elected at the start of the 26th Parliament in November 2015. He currently serves alongside Engin Altay and Levent Gök.

In 2015, Özel was awarded the Uğur Mumcu Politician of the Year Award by the Atatürkist Thought Association and the Contemporary Journalists Association.

Soma mine disaster
Özel, along with other CHP MPs from Manisa, made worldwide headlines following the Soma mine disaster in May 2014, where 301 miners were killed after coal mine collapsed in Soma, Manisa Province. The disaster caused large-scale criticism of the Justice and Development Party (AKP) government, since it had rejected a parliamentary motion that Özel had put forward to investigate mining incidents in Soma and other mining towns just two months before the disaster. His speeches before and after the disaster received nationwide attention.

See also
Manisa (electoral district)

References

External links
MP profile on the Grand National Assembly website
Twitter Account

Living people
People from Manisa
Ege University alumni
1974 births
Turkish pharmacists
Contemporary Republican People's Party (Turkey) politicians
Members of the 24th Parliament of Turkey
Members of the 25th Parliament of Turkey
Members of the 26th Parliament of Turkey